The Liberian FA Women's Cup called LFA Women's Cup is a women's association football competition in Liberia. pitting regional teams against each other. It was established in 2002. It is the women's equivalent of the Liberian FA Cup for men.

Finals

Most successful clubs

See also 
 Liberian Women's First Division
 Liberian Women's Super Cup

External links 
 Liberia (Women), List of Cup Winners - rsssf.com

Lib
Football competitions in Liberia